Ansongo Cercle is an administrative subdivision of the Gao Region of Mali. The administrative center (chef-lieu) is the town of Ansongo.  The Niger River passes through the cercle and plays an important role in transportation and the economy in the region.

The cercle is divided into seven communes:

Ansongo
Bara
Bourra
Ouattagouna
Talataye
Tessit
Tin-Hama

References

Cercles of Mali
Gao Region
Niger River